Goalball at the 1980 Summer Paralympics consisted of a men's team event.

Medal summary

Final round
Australia also competed in this competition but was disqualified for an unknown reason.

Final standings 

The men's teams were ranked as:

 Germany
 United States
 Holland
 Austria
 Belgium
 Yugoslavia
 Finland
 Israel
 Canada
 Denmark
 Egypt
 Great Britain

References 

1980 Summer Paralympics events
1980
Goalball in the Netherlands